Kamalakanta Bhattacharya may refer to:
 Kamalakanta Bhattacharya (Assam) (1853–1936), Indian essayist and poet
 Kamalakanta Bhattacharya (West Bengal) or Sadhaka Kamalakanta (1769–1821), Bengali Shakta poet and yogi